The 1972–73 California Golden Seals season was the California Golden Seals' sixth season in the National Hockey League (NHL).  The Seals were hit particularly hard by defections to the new World Hockey Association, dropping 12 points from the previous year and returning to the basement of the West Division. The Seals had the second worst record in the league, the only team they finished ahead of was the expansion New York Islanders. Making things even worse was that they finished behind the one of the two expansion clubs that season, the Atlanta Flames.

Offseason

Amateur Draft

Regular season

Final standings

Schedule and results

Player statistics

Skaters
Note: GP = Games played; G = Goals; A = Assists; Pts = Points; PIM = Penalties in minutes

†Denotes player spent time with another team before joining Seals. Stats reflect time with the Seals only. ‡Traded mid-season

Goaltenders
Note: GP = Games played; TOI = Time on ice (minutes); W=  Wins; L = Losses; T = Ties; GA = Goals against; SO = Shutouts; GAA = Goals against average

Transactions
The Seals were involved in the following transactions during the 1972–73 season:

Trades

Additions and subtractions

Playoffs
The Seals did not qualify for the playoffs

References
 Golden Seals on Hockey Database
 Golden Seals on Database Hockey

California Golden Seals seasons
Cali
Cali
Calif
Calif